Rádlo is a municipality and village in Jablonec nad Nisou District in the Liberec Region of the Czech Republic. It has about 900 inhabitants.

Administrative parts
The hamlet of Milíře is an administrative part of Rádlo.

References

Villages in Jablonec nad Nisou District